Gaelic games competitions are competitive events, organised either by the Gaelic Athletic Association (GAA) on its own or in association with other organisations in which Gaelic games or a set of compromise rules are played.

International
International Rules Series – Annual two-game series played between Ireland and Australia using a combination of rules from Gaelic football and Australian rules football.
 Hurling/Shinty International Series – Annual competition played between Ireland and Scotland using a combination of rules from Hurling and Shinty.

Interprovincial
Martin Donnelly Interprovincial Cup – Formerly known as the Railway Cup.  Contested by four teams each representing one of the Irish provinces Connacht, Leinster, Munster and Ulster.

Intercounty
The following are competitions contested by GAA county teams;

Football
All-Ireland Senior Football Championship (Sam Maguire Cup) – Tier 1 inter-county competition contested by teams of players selected from clubs within a county. Includes the Provincial championships and played on an initial group basis leading to play-offs. Most prestigious competition in Gaelic Football.
Tailteann Cup – Tier 2 inter-county competition. For counties eliminated in the early stages of the All-Ireland Championship and/or unable to be promoted to Division 2 or above of the League. Commenced in 2022.
All-Ireland Junior Football Championship - Tier 3 inter-county competition.
National Football League – Played in spring, contested by representative county teams. Teams are divided into four divisions based on their performances from the previous year.
All-Ireland Under-20 Football Championship – Knockout competition for players under the age of 20.
All-Ireland Minor Football Championship - Knockout competition for players under the age of 17.
Hastings Cup – Regional Under 21 football competition played from 1986 to 2017, organized by Longford County Board.
Fr. Manning Cup – Regional Juvenile football competition since 1965, organized by Longford County Board.
O'Byrne Cup – Preseason competition for Leinster counties.
Dr McKenna Cup – Preseason competition for Ulster counties.
McGrath Cup – Preseason competition for Munster counties.
FBD Insurance League – Preseason competition for Connacht counties.
Jim McGuigan Cup – League competition for county minor (U17) teams in Ulster plus Sligo. Games are played in March and April.
Tommy Murphy Cup (defunct) – Secondary competition for teams knocked out of the early rounds of the All-Ireland Senior Championship, it was abolished in 2008.
Owen Treacy Cup (defunct) – Winners of Tommy Murphy Cup v North American select team, it was only played once in 2006.

Hurling
All-Ireland Senior Hurling Championship (Liam MacCarthy Cup) – Tier 1 inter-county competition contested by teams of players selected from all the clubs within a county. Includes the Provincial championships and played on an initial group basis leading to play-offs. Most prestigious competition in Hurling.
 Joe McDonagh Cup – Tier 2 inter-county competition.
Christy Ring Cup – Tier 3 (was Tier 2 prior to 2018) inter-county competition.
Nicky Rackard Cup – Tier 4 (was Tier 3 prior to 2018) inter-county competition.
 Lory Meagher Cup – Tier 5 (was Tier 4 prior to 2018) inter-county competition.
National Hurling League – Played in spring, Contested by teams selected from all the clubs within a county. Teams are divided into six divisions based on their performances from the previous year. Top 2 teams from each division enter a knockout phase.
All-Ireland Under-20 Hurling Championship – Knockout competition for players under the age of 21 at the start of the year.
 All-Ireland Minor Hurling Championship - Knockout competition for players under the age of 18 at the start of the year
 All-Ireland Intermediate Hurling Championship (defunct) - Knockout competition for second teams of senior counties
 Munster Senior Hurling League – Preseason competition for Munster counties.  
 Walsh Cup – Preseason competition for tier 1 Leinster counties plus Galway and Antrim.
 Kehoe Cup – Preseason competition for tier 2 Leinster counties.
 Kehoe Shield – Preseason competition for tier 3 Leinster counties.
 Connacht Senior Hurling League – Preseason competition for Connacht counties.
 Conor McGurk Cup – Preseason competition for weaker Ulster counties and universities.

Interclub

Football
 All-Ireland Senior Club Football Championship
 All-Ireland Intermediate Club Football Championship
 All-Ireland Junior Club Football Championship
Antrim Senior Football Championship
Armagh Senior Football Championship
 Armagh Junior Football Championship
 Armagh Intermediate Football Championship
Carlow Senior Football Championship
Cavan Senior Football Championship
 Cavan Intermediate Football Championship
 Cavan Junior Football Championship
 Cavan Under-21 Football Championship
 Cavan Minor Football Championship
 Clare Senior Football Championship
 Clare Club Football League - Division 1 (Cusack Cup)
 Clare Intermediate Football Championship
 Clare Junior A Football Championship
 Clare Under-21 A Football Championship
 Connacht Senior Club Football Championship
 Connacht Intermediate Club Football Championship
 Connacht Junior Club Football Championship
Cork Premier Senior Football Championship
Cork Senior A Football Championship
Cork Premier Intermediate Football Championship
 Cork Intermediate A Football Championship
 Cork Premier Junior Football Championship
 Cork Junior A Football Championship
 Cork Junior B Football Championship
 Cork Under-21 Football Championship
Derry Senior Football Championship
 Derry Intermediate Football Championship
Donegal Senior Football Championship
 Donegal Intermediate Football Championship
 Donegal Junior Football Championship
Down Senior Football Championship
Dublin Senior Football Championship
 Dublin Senior B Football Championship
 Dublin Intermediate Football Championship
 Dublin Junior Football Championship
 Dublin Under 21 Football Championship
 Dublin Minor Football Championship
 Duhallow Junior A Football Championship
 East Kerry Senior Football Championship
 East Kerry Junior Football Championship
Fermanagh Senior Football Championship
Galway Senior Football Championship
Kerry Senior Football Championship
 Kerry Club Football Championship
 Kerry Intermediate Football Championship
Kildare Senior Football Championship
 Kildare Intermediate Football Championship
 Kildare Junior Football Championship
 Kildare Under 21 Football Championship
 Kildare Senior Football League Division 1
 Kildare Senior Football League Division 2
 Kildare Senior Football League Division 3
 Kildare Senior Football League Division 4
 Kilkenny Senior Football Championship
 Kilkenny Intermediate Football Championship
Laois Senior Football Championship
Laois Intermediate Football Championship
Laois Junior Football Championship
 Leinster Senior Club Football Championship
 Leinster Intermediate Club Football Championship
 Leinster Junior Club Football Championship
Leitrim Senior Football Championship
Limerick Senior Football Championship
Longford Senior Football Championship
Louth Senior Football Championship
Louth Intermediate Football Championship
Mayo Senior Football Championship
Mayo Intermediate Football Championship
Mayo Junior Football Championship
 Mayo Minor Football Championship
Meath Senior Football Championship
 Meath Intermediate Football Championship
 Meath Junior Football Championship
 Mid Kerry Senior Football Championship
Monaghan Senior Football Championship
 Munster Senior Club Football Championship
 Munster Intermediate Club Football Championship
 Munster Junior Club Football Championship
 North Kerry Senior Football Championship
Offaly Senior Football Championship
Roscommon Senior Football Championship
Sligo Senior Football Championship
 Sligo Intermediate Football Championship
 Sligo Junior Football Championship
 Sligo Under 20 Football Championship
Tipperary Senior Football Championship
 Tipperary Intermediate Football Championship
Tyrone Senior Football Championship
 Ulster Senior Club Football Championship
 Ulster Intermediate Club Football Championship
 Ulster Junior Club Football Championship
 Ulster Minor Club Football Championship
Waterford Senior Football Championship
 Waterford Intermediate Football Championship
Westmeath Senior Football Championship
 Westmeath Intermediate Football Championship
 West Kerry Senior Football Championship
Wexford Senior Football Championship
Wicklow Senior Football Championship

Hurling
 All-Ireland Senior Club Hurling Championship
 All-Ireland Intermediate Club Hurling Championship
 All-Ireland Junior Club Hurling Championship
Antrim Senior Hurling Championship
Antrim Intermediate Hurling Championship
 Armagh Senior Hurling Championship
Carlow Senior Hurling Championship
 Cavan Senior Hurling Championship
 Clare Senior Hurling Championship
 Clare Intermediate Hurling Championship
 Clare Junior A Hurling Championship
 Clare Under-21 A Hurling Championship
 Connacht Senior Club Hurling Championship
 Connacht Intermediate Club Hurling Championship
 Connacht Junior Club Hurling Championship
Cork Premier Senior Hurling Championship
Cork Senior A Hurling Championship
 Cork Premier Intermediate Hurling Championship
 Cork Intermediate A Hurling Championship
 Cork Premier Junior Hurling Championship
 Cork Junior A Hurling Championship
 Cork Junior B Hurling Championship
 Cork Under-21 Hurling Championship
 Derry Senior Hurling Championship
 Donegal Senior Hurling Championship
 Down Senior Hurling Championship
Dublin Senior Hurling Championship
 Dublin Senior B Hurling Championship
 Dublin Intermediate Hurling Championship
 Dublin Junior Hurling Championship
 Dublin Minor Hurling Championship
 Duhallow Junior A Hurling Championship
 Fermanagh Senior Hurling Championship
Galway Senior Hurling Championship
Galway Intermediate Hurling Championship
 Kerry Senior Hurling Championship
 Kerry Intermediate Hurling Championship
 Kerry Under-21 Hurling Championship
 Kildare Senior Hurling Championship
Kilkenny Senior Hurling Championship
 Kilkenny Intermediate Hurling Championship
 Kilkenny Premier Junior Hurling Championship
Laois Senior Hurling Championship
 Laois Junior Hurling Championship
 Leinster Senior Club Hurling Championship
 Leinster Intermediate Club Hurling Championship
 Leinster Junior Club Hurling Championship
 Leitrim Senior Hurling Championship
Limerick Senior Hurling Championship
Limerick Premier Intermediate Hurling Championship
 Limerick Intermediate Hurling Championship
 Limerick Junior Hurling Championship
 Longford Senior Hurling Championship
 Louth Senior Hurling Championship
 Mayo Senior Hurling Championship
 Meath Senior Hurling Championship
 Monaghan Senior Hurling Championship
 Munster Senior Club Hurling Championship
 Munster Intermediate Club Hurling Championship
 Munster Junior Club Hurling Championship
 Offaly Senior Hurling Championship
 Offaly Intermediate Hurling Championship
 Offaly Junior A Hurling Championship
 Roscommon Senior Hurling Championship
 Sligo Senior Hurling Championship
Tipperary Senior Hurling Championship
Tipperary Premier Intermediate Hurling Championship
 Tipperary Intermediate Hurling Championship
 Tipperary Junior A Hurling Championship
 Tyrone Senior Hurling Championship
 Ulster Senior Club Hurling Championship
 Ulster Intermediate Club Hurling Championship
 Ulster Junior Club Hurling Championship
Waterford Senior Hurling Championship
 Waterford Intermediate Hurling Championship
 Waterford Junior Hurling Championship
Westmeath Senior Hurling Championship
 Wexford Senior Hurling Championship
 Wexford Intermediate Hurling Championship
 Wexford Intermediate A Hurling Championship
 Wexford Junior Hurling Championship
 Wicklow Senior Hurling Championship

Intervarsity 
Competitions organised by Higher Education GAA for teams based at third-level education institutions.

Football
Sigerson Cup – All-Ireland competition for the Universities of Ireland
 Trench Cup
British University Gaelic football Championship

Hurling
Fitzgibbon Cup – All-Ireland competition for the Universities of Ireland
 Ryan Cup
British University Hurling Championship

Intercolleges

Dual
All-Ireland Vocational Schools Championship - football and hurling competition. County teams made up of players from Vocational schools at Under-18, U-16 and U-14 levels.

Football
Hogan Cup – All-Ireland football competition for provincial school championship winners
Connacht Championship – Connacht senior A football championship for secondary schools
Leinster Championship – Leinster senior A football championship for secondary schools
Corn Uí Mhuirí (Munster Championship) – Munster senior A football championship for secondary schools
MacRory Cup (Ulster Championship) – Ulster senior A football championship for secondary schools
Frewen Cup - Munster junior football championship for secondary schools

Hurling
 Dr Croke Cup - All-Ireland Senior A hurling competition for secondary schools
 O'Keefe Cup - All-Ireland Senior B hurling competition for secondary schools
 Leinster Colleges Senior Hurling Championship
 Dr Harty Cup – Munster senior A hurling championship for secondary schools
 Dean Ryan Cup – Munster schools junior hurling championship
 Mageean Cup – Ulster schools senior hurling championship

Youth
Feile Peil na nÓg

Interfirm
 All Ireland Interfirm Senior Football Championship
 All Ireland Interfirm Junior Football Championship
 All Ireland Interfirm Senior Hurling Championship
 All Ireland Interfirm Junior Hurling Championship

Competitions outside Ireland

North American Youth Competitions
Continental Youth Championships (CYC)

New York City
New York Senior Football Championship
New York Senior Hurling Championship

North American Board area
The four major divisions of the North American GAA each have a divisional championship in each code and each grade.  Divisional winners, and sometimes runners-up, go on to the North American finals which are played over the Labor Day weekend in September.
North American Senior Football Championship
North American Senior Hurling Championship

Britain
London Senior Football Championship
London Senior Hurling Championship
London Intermediate Football Championship
London Intermediate Hurling Championship
London Junior Football Championship
London Reserve Football Championship

Colleges
Northern California Collegiate Hurling Championship
Midwest Collegiate Hurling Championship

See also
 Players Champions Cup

References

 
Competitions
Gaelic games